Absolute Championship Akhmat (ACA), formerly known as (Absolute Championship Berkut), is a Russian mixed martial arts, kickboxing and brazilian jiu-jitsu organization and one of the leading promotions in Europe.

This list is an up-to-date roster of those fighters currently under contract with the ACA League. Fighters are organized by weight class and within their weight class by their number of fights with the promotion.

Each fight record has four categories: wins, losses, draws, and no-contests. All fight records in this article are displayed in that order, with fights resulting in a no-contest listed in parentheses.

Fighters

Heavyweight (265 Ib, 120.2 kg)

Light Heavyweight (205 Ib, 93 kg)

Middleweight (185 Ib, 83.9 kg)

Welterweight (170 Ib, 77.1 kg)

Lightweight (155 Ib, 70.3 kg)

Featherweight (145 Ib, 65.8 kg)

Bantamweight (135 Ib, 61.2 kg)

Flyweight (125 Ib, 56.7 kg)

 Unless otherwise cited, all records are retrieved from tapology.com.
 Unless otherwise cited, all fighters listed are retrieved from aca-mma.com.

See also
2023 in Absolute Championship Akhmat
List of ACA champions
List of current UFC fighters
List of current Bellator fighters
List of current Brave CF fighters
List of current Combate Global fighters
List of current Invicta FC fighters
List of current KSW fighters
List of current ONE fighters
List of current PFL fighters
List of current Rizin FF fighters
List of current Road FC fighters

References

External links

Lists of mixed martial artists
Absolute Championship Akhmat